West Radford Commercial Historic District is a national historic district located at Radford, Virginia. It encompasses 19 contributing buildings in a commercial section of West Radford.  It was developed after 1890, and includes several fine examples of Victorian and early-20th century commercial buildings. Notable buildings include the Radford Trust Co. Building, the Ashmead Building and the Commercial Block.

It was listed on the National Register of Historic Places in 2005.

References

Historic districts on the National Register of Historic Places in Virginia
Romanesque Revival architecture in Virginia
Buildings and structures in Radford, Virginia
National Register of Historic Places in Radford, Virginia